Claire Wilson (born c. 1986 in Shetland, Scotland) is an athlete residing in Jersey. She won running events for Shetland, including:
Isle of Man 2001: 800m silver 
Guernsey 2003: 1,500m gold; 800m and  bronze 
Shetland 2005: 800m and 1,500m gold 
Rhodes 2007: 800m and 1,500m gold.

She has won various running events representing Jersey, including
Isle of Wight 2011:  gold; 800m and 1,500m silver.women's 4×100 metres relay team.

References

Living people
1986 births
British female athletes
British female steeplechase runners
Jersey athletes
Jersey sportswomen
Scottish female middle-distance runners
Scottish female steeplechase runners